The 1972–73 Soviet Cup was the 15th edition of the Soviet Cup ice hockey tournament. 28 teams participated in the tournament, which was won by CSKA Moscow, who claimed their ninth title.

Participating teams

Tournament

First round

Second round

1/8 finals

Quarterfinals

Semifinals

Final

External links 
 Tournament on hockeyarchives.info
 Tournament on hockeyarchives.ru

Cup
Soviet Cup (ice hockey) seasons